Korai-ye Sofla (also Romanized as Korā’ī-ye Soflā and Kara’i Sofla; also known as Korāhi Soflā, Korāhī-ye Soflā, and Korā’ī-ye Pā’īn) is a village in Shahid Modarres Rural District, in the Central District of Shushtar County, Khuzestan Province, Iran. At the 2006 census, its population was 36, in 10 families.

References 

Populated places in Shushtar County